Utilicraft Aerospace Industries is a company created in December 2004 by a spin-off of American Utilicraft Corporation as they moved their headquarters to Albuquerque, New Mexico. Their sole project was the model FF-1080-300ER, a short-haul cargo (freight feeder) aircraft for shipping and courier services. As a startup company, they advertise minimalist engineering to reduce time to market, forgoing cabin pressurization and a retractable landing gear yet lifting a 10-ton cargo pallet.

Announced customers have included Benin Airlines, Afra Airlines, and Mid America Aero, LLC. companies.

Production was scheduled to begin at about 24 planes per year beginning in late 2007. Until FAA certification of their first model, which would take some years, they intended to rely on the International freight feeder market.

Utilicraft generated initial capital with an IPO, so their survival depends on the stock market and their investor relations. Their stock began 2007 at $1.00 per share and fell to $0.06 by the end of the year. It has not traded over ten cents since. 

In 2007, the Company sold its freight aircraft development program for a major equity interest in Freight Feeder Aircraft Corporation www.freightfeeder.com, plus a royalty on 2,000 aircraft. Freight Feeder Aircraft Corporation is continuing the development of the aircraft program. 

Utilicraft is now seeking new products via mergers and acquisitions.

Aircraft manufacturers of the United States